Shorter House may refer to:

United States
Shorter Mansion, Eufaula, Alabama, listed on the National Register of Historic Places in Barbour County, Alabama
 Shorter House (Crawford, New York), listed on the NRHP in Orange County, New York

United Kingdom
Shorter House (music publisher)

See also
Short House (disambiguation)